Baked is an Indian comedy web series created by Pechkas Pictures and ScoopWhoop Talkies. It chronicles the misadventures of three university flatmates who start midnight food delivery service. It is written and produced by Vishwajoy Mukherjee and Akash Mehta and directed by Mukherjee. The show's primary cast includes Pranay Manchanda, Shantanu Anam, Manik Papneja, and Kriti Vij.

The first two seasons were shot in Hindu College and University of Delhi, and is one of the most-watched shows by students in India.

The third part of the series was made into a film. Principal photography began in October 2018 and was wrapped up in February 2019. However, the third part was released as a five-episode series as the third season titled Baked – The Bad Trip. It premiered on 2 May 2022 on Voot.

Premise
The first two seasons revolves around the life of three friends and roommates Oni, Haris and Body, students of Delhi University, and finding their way hard to survive in Delhi.

In the third season Oni, Haris and Body reunite for a road trip to the hills with each of them having a secret agenda. From getting lost in rural India to being mistaken for drug smugglers and getting arrested, nothing goes according to plan for the boys.

Cast

Main
Pranay Manchanda as Mohammad Haris
Shantanu Anam as Anirban Guha Thakurta / Oni
Manik Papneja as Shagun / Body
Kriti Vij as Tara Brara

Recurring
Maheep Singh as Inspector Gulaab Singh
Ashish Dha as Professor Bakshi
Rahul Tewari as Tewari
Sidharth Bhardwaj as Coach
Gopal Verma as Pradhan
Disha Thakur as Jaspreet, Body's wife
Mohit Satyanand as Tara's father
Jayshree Jain as Tara's mother
Pankaj Sidana as Body's father
Neeti Kapur as Body's mother
Karam Vir Lamba as Shantanu
Chunky Pandey as himself / DJ Danger Guy

References

External links

Hindi-language web series
2015 web series debuts